Nana Ioseliani (born 12 February 1962) is a Georgian chess player. She was awarded by FIDE the Woman Grandmaster title in 1980 and the International Master title in 1993.

Already in 1978 she was supposed to be on the Soviet woman's team playing at the 23rd Chess Olympiad in Buenos Aires. However, the entire team consisted of Georgian players, and Soviet officials replaced Ioseliani - the youngest - for a Russian-born player. Ioseliani was on the Soviet team during the 24th and 25th Olympiads. Later she joined the Georgian team in the 30th Chess Olympiad and again in the 31st and 32nd. Her team won gold all five times. She participated in the three next Olympiads too; Georgia ending in 3rd, 2nd and 4th place, respectively. Her individual score was 65 points from 88 games (+49, =32, -7).

In 1979 and in 1980 she was the girls winner of the European Junior Chess Championship. 
She has twice won the candidate's tournament to play for the Women's World Chess Championship. In 1988 she challenged defending champion Maia Chiburdanidze, and lost by 8½ to 9½ (+2, =11, -3). In 1993 she played Xie Jun, and lost by 2½ to 8½.

She has won the Women's Soviet Chess Championship four times. Ioseliani also played for Georgia in the 1997 World Team Chess Championship, scoring 1½/7 on board 2.

Since 2003, Ioseliani has taken a break from chess playing, and is an entrepreneur in Prague.

In 2021, Ioseliani appeared in the documentary Glory to the Queen alongside Nana Alexandria, Nona Gaprindashvili, and Maia Chiburdanidze.

In 1978 she was acting in a cinematography too. In a short comedy Pereryv she was a chess player, who beat all her male colleagues.

References

External links
 
 
 
 

1962 births
Living people
Soviet female chess players
Female chess players from Georgia (country)
Chess International Masters
Chess woman grandmasters
Chess Olympiad competitors
Sportspeople from Tbilisi